Chaldean (also Chaldaean or Chaldee) may refer to:

Language
 an old name for the Aramaic language, particularly Biblical Aramaic
 Chaldean Neo-Aramaic, a modern Aramaic language
 Chaldean script, a variant of the Syriac alphabet

Places
 Chaldea, ancient region whose inhabitants were known as Chaldeans
 Neo-Babylonian Empire, also called the Chaldean Empire
 Chaldean Town, neighborhood of Detroit, Michigan, U.S.

Religion
 Chaldean Catholics, adherents of the Chaldean Catholic Church
 Chaldean Catholic Church, Eastern Rite Catholic Church in full communion with the Catholic Church
 Chaldean Rite, the East Syriac Rite of the Chaldean Catholics
 Chaldean Oracles, played a role in the start of the Christian church 1st centuries BC and AD
 Chaldean Syrian Church, title used for the Assyrian Church of the East in India

See also
 Khaldi (disambiguation)
 Assyrian people

Language and nationality disambiguation pages